Niv Berkowitz (born April 25, 1986) is an Israeli professional basketball player for Hapoel Haifa of the Israeli National League. He is the son of former basketball player Miki Berkowitz.

Early years
Berkowitz was born in Ramat HaSharon, Israel, he played for Hapoel Ramat HaSharon and Maccabi Tel Aviv youth teams. In 2004, Berkowitz joined Marquette University in Milwaukee, Wisconsin, he played in 7 games before starting his professional career.

Professional career
On July 4, 2013, Berkowitz signed with Hapoel Eilat for the 2013–14 season.

On July 4, 2014, Berkowitz signed a one-year contract extension with Hapoel Eilat. he helped Eilat reach the Israeli League Finals, where they eventually lost to Hapoel Jerusalem.

On July 19, 2015, Berkowitz signed with Ironi Nahariya for the 2015–16 season. That season, he led the league in assists by averaging 6.7 per game. Berkowitz was also selected to the Israeli League All-Star game.

On July 5, 2016, Berkowitz signed a one-year contract extension with Nahariya.

On August 1, 2017, Berkowitz returned to Hapoel Eilat for a second stint, signing a one-year contract.

On August 17, 2018, Berkowitz signed a one-year deal with Elitzur Eito Ashkelon of the National League. In 29 games played for Asheklon, he averaged 10.6 points, 3.5 rebounds, 5.8 assists and 1.4 steals per game, earning a spot in the All-National League First Team.

On June 24, 2019, Berkowitz signed with Hapoel Haifa for the 2019–20 season.

Israeli national team
Berkowitz was a member of the Israeli U-18 and U-20 national teams.

References

External links
 RealGM profile
 FIBA profile
 Basket.co.il profile

1986 births
Living people
Hapoel Afula players
Hapoel Eilat basketball players
Hapoel Haifa B.C. players
Hapoel Holon players
Elitzur Eito Ashkelon players
Ironi Kiryat Ata players
Ironi Nahariya players
Israeli Basketball Premier League players
Israeli men's basketball players
Maccabi Ashdod B.C. players
Marquette Golden Eagles men's basketball players
People from Ramat HaSharon
Point guards
Shooting guards